Bathyterebra is a genus of marine snails, gastropod molluscs in the family Terebridae, subfamily Pellifroniinae.

Species
Species within the genus Bathyterebra include:
 Bathyterebra benthalis (Dall, 1889)
 Bathyterebra coriolisi (Aubry, 1999)
 Bathyterebra zhongshaensis Malcolm, Terryn & Fedosov, 2020

References

External links
 Fedosov, A. E.; Malcolm, G.; Terryn, Y.; Gorson, J.; Modica, M. V.; Holford, M.; Puillandre, N. (2020). Phylogenetic classification of the family Terebridae (Neogastropoda: Conoidea). Journal of Molluscan Studies

Terebridae